The Medgyessy Government was the fifth government of Hungary after the regime change.

History 
The government was formed by the same two parties as the Horn Government between 1994 and 1998: the MSZP and the SZDSZ. Interestingly, Prime Minister Péter Medgyessy was not a member of any governing party (nor any other party). The government took the oath of office on 27 May 2002.

The coalition was in crisis twice: first in 2002, when it was revealed that Medgyessy was a secret agent before the system change (D-209). At that time, the SZDSZ still assured Medgyessy of his trust and helped him stay in his position. The second crisis occurred in August 2004, when Medgyessy wanted to replace István Csillag, Minister of Economy, during a government change. In response, the SZDSZ (whose candidate was Csillag) withdrew confidence from the head of government, who “fled” to resign from the impending motion of censure. The Prime Minister first wanted to resign on 25 August, but withdrew a little later, but submitted it; following his resignation, he served as Executive Prime Minister until 29 September 2004. The prime minister's successor was Ferenc Gyurcsány and his first government.

Party breakdown

References 

Hungarian governments
2002 establishments in Hungary
2004 disestablishments in Hungary
Cabinets established in 2002
Cabinets disestablished in 2004